Calliobothrium is a genus of cestodes in the order Tetraphyllidea.
Most, or possibly all, of the known species are parasites found within the intestines of members of the shark family Triakidae. It is known that in some instances at least two different species of Calliobothrium can  parasitise the same species of shark.

Species
Calliobothrium aetidiobatis Shipley, 1900
Calliobothrium australis Ostrowski de Nunez, 1973
Calliobothrium cisloi Bernot & Caira, 2017
Calliobothrium convolutum Yoshida, 1917
Calliobothrium corollatum Monticelli, 1887
Calliobothrium coronatum (Rudolphi, 1819)
Calliobothrium creeveyae Butler, 1987
Calliobothrium euzeti Bernot, Caira & Pickering, 2015
Calliobothrium farmeri Southwell, 1911
Calliobothrium filicolle Zschokke, 1888
Calliobothrium nodosum Yoshida, 1917
Calliobothrium shirozame Kurashima, Shimizu, Mano, Ogawa & Fujita, 2014
Calliobothrium tylotocephalum Alexander, 1963
Calliobothrium verticillatum (Rudolphi, 1819)
Calliobothrium whitemanorum Bernot & Caira, 2017

References

Cestoda
Cestoda genera